Saeid Gholamalibeygi (born March 4, 1993, in Arak) is an Iranian footballer who plays as a defender for Persian Gulf Pro League club Nassaji Mazandaran.

Club career

Nassaji
He made his debut for Nassaji Mazandaran in first fixture of 2020–21 Persian Gulf Pro League against Aluminium Arak.

Honours 

Nassaji
Hazfi Cup (1): 2021–22

References 

Living people
1993 births
Association football defenders
Iranian footballers
Esteghlal F.C. players
Naft Masjed Soleyman F.C. players
Aluminium Arak players
Naft Tehran F.C. players
Niroye Zamini players
Shahin Bushehr F.C. players
Saipa F.C. players
Nassaji Mazandaran players
People from Arak, Iran